1-Ethyl-3-(3-dimethylaminopropyl)carbodiimide (EDC, EDAC or EDCI) is a water-soluble carbodiimide usually handled as the hydrochloride. It is typically employed in the 4.0-6.0 pH range. It is generally used as a carboxyl activating agent for the coupling of primary amines to yield amide bonds. While other carbodiimides like dicyclohexylcarbodiimide (DCC) or diisopropylcarbodiimide (DIC) are also employed for this purpose, EDC has the advantage that the urea byproduct formed (often challenging to remove in the case of DCC or DIC) can be washed away from the amide product using dilute acid.  Additionally, EDC can also be used to activate phosphate groups in order to form phosphomonoesters and phosphodiesters. Common uses for this carbodiimide include peptide synthesis, protein crosslinking to nucleic acids, but also in the preparation of immunoconjugates. EDC is often used in combination with N-hydroxysuccinimide (NHS) for the immobilisation of large biomolecules. Recent work has also used EDC to assess the structure state of uracil nucleobases in RNA.

Preparation
EDC is commercially available. It may be prepared by coupling ethyl isocyanate to N,N-dimethylpropane-1,3-diamine to give a urea, followed by dehydration:

Mechanism 

EDC couples primary amines, and other nucleophiles, to carboxylic acids by creating an activated ester leaving group. First, the carbonyl of the acid attacks the carbodiimide of EDC, and there is a subsequent proton transfer. The primary amine then attacks the carbonyl carbon of the acid which forms a tetrahedral intermediate before collapsing and discharging the urea byproduct. The desired amide is obtained.

References

Further reading
 
 

Carbodiimides
Reagents for biochemistry